Gracixalus quyeti is a species of shrub frogs from Vietnam.

References

quyeti
Amphibians described in 2008
Amphibians of Vietnam
Endemic fauna of Vietnam